John McCaffrey may refer to:
 John McCaffrey (fundraiser) (born 1968), North Irish fundraising professional
 John McCaffrey (hurler) (born 1987), Irish hurler
 Bert McCaffrey (John Albert McCaffrey, 1893–1955), Canadian ice hockey player
 Pete McCaffrey (John Paul McCaffrey, 1938–2012), American basketball player